Hot-Rod and Reel! is a 1959 Warner Bros. Looney Tunes cartoon directed by Chuck Jones. The script was written by Michael Maltese, and the film score was composed by Milt Franklyn.

The short was released on May 9, 1959, and stars Wile E. Coyote and the Road Runner.

Plot
Wile E. Coyote (Famishius Famishius) attempts several ways to get the Roadrunner (Super-Sonicus-Tastius). The Roadrunner reaches two outcroppings. When Wile E. tries it, the end of said outcropping comes off. Just when he thinks he is about to suffer gravity yet again, Wile. E is saved by a tree branch. He tries to go on the plateau nearby, only for the plateau to fall to a river. A fish nearby is spooked when Wile E. gets his newest scheme.

1. The Coyote races after the Roadrunner with his new roller skates. When the Roadrunner tries to trip the Coyote, Wile E., in time, leaps in the air and sticks his tongue out at the bird, but little does he know, he is about to fall off a cliff yet again. He ends up in the ground, with only his feet sticking out, as the wheels fall off one of the skates.

2. After getting an explosive camera kit, Wile E. prepares for his newest deception. The Roadrunner is intrigued by the signs. When the Roadrunner gets ready for his picture, the gun goes off on the Coyote. As the Roadrunner speeds away, the dazed Wile E. sees the one flaw of his attempt: he forgot to take off the lens cap that was on the entire time.

3. As the Roadrunner taunts the Coyote from above, Wile E. prepares a trampoline. However, when he jumps, he gets trapped inside like a burlap sack.

4. Now armed with a crossbow and dynamite, Wile E. prepares for his plan. However, when he lights the fuse and the Roadrunner comes, the crossbow fires yet the dynamite is left behind to blow him up.

5. Now resorting to his best friend Acme, Wile E. receives a jet propelled pogo stick. However, when the Coyote prepares the pogo stick, it propels him to the cliff behind him. Down he goes again.

6. Using railroad deception again, Wile E. hammers a crossing sign, accompanied by tracks set up and a record player with Hi-Fi railroad crossing sounds playing. When the Roadrunner stops, the Coyote tries to catch the bird, only to be run over by an actual train.

7. Having almost blown his top with simple traps, Wile E. uses 12 bombs down an extremely long slide (identical to the one he had tried to use in Zoom and Bored).  He lifts the slide door to release the bombs from their bin, but none of them come out. He tries shaking the bin moderately, then violently. After pondering, he also tries to prise them out, but when he tries to stomp on them, Boom! A dazed Wile E. slides down, and the Roadrunner passes over him to add insult to injury.

8. Wile E. receives another of Acme's products, a jet-propelled unicycle. When the Coyote lights the fuse, he is dragged away. Wile E. tries to balance himself and succeeds. As he approached the Roadrunner, the bird seemingly speeds off in a cloud of dust, but just after Wile zooms by the dust cloud, the cloud disappears, revealing the Roadrunner's still there, having faked Wile out. Wile E. then falls off a cliff and the resulting cloud of smoke has the words "The End" on it.

See also
 Looney Tunes and Merrie Melodies filmography (1950–1959)

References

External links
 

1959 animated films
1959 short films
1950s Warner Bros. animated short films
Looney Tunes shorts
American animated short films
Wile E. Coyote and the Road Runner films
Short films directed by Chuck Jones
Films about Canis
Animated films about birds
Animated films without speech
Films with screenplays by Michael Maltese
Films scored by Milt Franklyn
Animated films about mammals